Tree Fort Angst (sometimes abbreviated to TFA) was an indie pop band that was originally a solo project of former St. Christopher guitarist Terry Banks.

History
Banks began working as a part of Tree Fort Angst in 1991, when he released a cassette-only album. This was followed by an EP in 1992 on the German label 'A Turntable Friend', Six Songs. TFA then expanded to a full band with the addition of John Gotschalk (bass) and Hunter Duke (drums). Although the band only released a handful of further EPs and singles during their time together before splitting up in 1994, their output was collected on two posthumous compilations.

Banks lists among his influences Postcard Records bands Orange Juice and Aztec Camera, The Beatles, The Jam, Everything But The Girl, The Go-Betweens, The Smiths, and The Chills.

Banks later joined Glo-worm, The Saturday People, and Dot Dash, while Gotschalk joined the Red Hot Lava Men. Duke is now a member of Hotel X.

Discography

Singles
Six Songs 7-inch EP (1992) A Turntable Friend
Buzzing With Beauty and Wonder 7-inch EP (1992) Velodrome
"Parting Kiss" 7-inch flexi-disc (1993) Ad Lithium Pop
Tilting at Windmills EP (1994) Bus Stop
"Hope" (1995) Stickboy

Albums
Fifteen Songs of Vim and Vigor  (cassette) (1991) (self-released)
Knee Deep in the Rococo Excess of Tree Fort Angst (1997) Bus Stop
Last Page in the Book of Love (2002) Foxyboy

Compilation appearances
"Parting Kiss", on CMJ New Music Report CD album (1991) CMJ
"You Should’ve Seen The One That Got Away", on One Last Kiss CD album (1992) Spin Art
"Trampoline", on Burning The Midnight Firefly cassette/fanzine (1993) BTMF
"Miss You Essay", on Stars On Ice cassette/fanzine (1993) Traumatone
"Trampoline", on A Love Like Lead cassette/fanzine (1993) Lionhead Fountain
"Trampoline", on Something Pretty Beautiful CD album (1993) Brilliant
"Fin De Siecle", on Calling At Duke Street split 7-inch EP (1993) A Turntable Friend
"Back In Your Life", on Can You Talk To The Dude? (Jonathan Richman covers CD) (1994) Alienor
"Tuesday", on Pop Culture Press 4 CD (1997) PCP
"Hope", on A Boy, A Girl, and A Rendezvous CD (2001) Red Roses For Me

References

External links
Schabe, Patrick (2003) "TREE FORT ANGST Last Page in the Book of Love review", PopMatters

Indie pop groups from Virginia
Musical groups established in 1991
Musical groups disestablished in 1994